Digital Jukebox Records began as a British hip hop record label under the name of FJ/Fatt Jointz Recordings in the early 1990s which has been an underground source for the success of some recording artists ever since. Label head Mark Duffus had very close musical links with many prominent East Coast / New York record producers and musicians.

History
Fatt Jointz or FJ Entertainment's name was changed to Digital Jukebox later on in 2007 under a complete rebrand when BBC Publishing (under BBC Worldwide) became their publishing partners and the music genres of the label's artists became more diverse. The first official global song release under FJ was "With Fx" which was produced by Mark Duffus (a.k.a. Sure Shot / Blak Prophetz). Over the years, the label had worked with several notable recording artists such as Ced Gee of Ultramagnetic MCs (who featured on the Blak Prophetz album The 2nd Coming), Fonda Rae, Joyce Sims, Yvonne Curtis and Funk Division, among others.

Documentary
In 2020, the label was involved in a new documentary about the life and career of Yvonne Curtis as mentioned in the Jamaica Gleaner and Future Topic Magazine, due for release sometime in the near future.

2021-present
In 2021, the label expressed an interest in children’s stories and took on board a selected team voice over experts including Mark Anthony, Blak Prophetz who was the voice behind the successful children’s game by Hasbro called Crazy Cash Machine and his daughter Alicia Duffus who contributes in script writing. The first recording was released on 24 December 2020 entitled 'No Competition' via Sony Music distribution, The Orchard (company) and was recently reviewed by Mkuu Amani of Toronto Caribbean who said "The audio-story, which offers a humorous take on a classic tale about an over-confident, fast-running hare, aims to encourage more youngsters to read books and enjoy audio stories. The episode enlists Anthony’s vocal talents, the versatile artist performing all of the character voice overs, including the hare’s role, a character with a distinctly Caribbean personality."

Artists

 Blak Prophetz - artist/management
 Ced Gee - remix & various productions
 Funk Division - artist/management
 Dee Shy - artist/management
 Kim Tavares - artist/management
 Fonda Rae - artist/management
 Joyce Sims - remix & various productions
 Dawn Penn - agent/management
 Pickney Dem - artist/management
Yvonne Curtis - artist/management
 Rebekah Ross - artist/management
Loose_Ends_(band) - artist/management
Dexter_Wansel - artist/management

See also
 List of record labels
 List of independent UK record labels
 List of electronic music record labels

References

External links

Digital Jukebox Records at Discogs
Fatt Jointz Records at Discogs
Summertime at The Edge Magazine

Record labels established in 1986
British record labels
Hip hop record labels
British independent record labels
Electronic music record labels
Record labels based in Birmingham, West Midlands
Contemporary R&B record labels